Strang splitting is a numerical method for solving differential equations that are decomposable into a sum of differential operators. It is named after Gilbert Strang. It is used to speed up calculation for problems involving operators on very different time scales, for example, chemical reactions in fluid dynamics, and to solve multidimensional partial differential equations by reducing them to a sum of one-dimensional problems.

Fractional step methods 
As a precursor to Strang splitting, consider a differential equation of the form

 

where ,  are differential operators.

 .

If  and  commute, then by the exponential laws this is equivalent to

 .

If they do not, then by the Baker–Campbell–Hausdorff formula it is still possible to replace the exponential of the sum by a product of exponentials at the cost of a first order error:

 .

This gives rise to a numerical scheme where one, instead of solving the original initial problem, solves both subproblems alternating:

 
 
 
 
 etc.

In this context,  is a numerical scheme solving the subproblem

 

to first order. The approach is not restricted to linear problems, that is,  can be any differential operator.

Strang splitting 
Strang splitting extends this approach to second order by choosing another order of operations. Instead of taking full time steps with each operator, instead, one performs time steps as follows:

 
 
 
 
 
 
 etc.

One can prove that Strang splitting is second order by using either the Baker-Campbell-Hausdorff formula, Rooted tree analysis or a direct comparison of the error terms using Taylor expansion. For the scheme to be second order accurate,  must be a second order approximation to the solution operator as well.

See also
List of operator splitting topics
Matrix splitting

References 
 Strang, Gilbert. On the construction and comparison of difference schemes. SIAM Journal on Numerical Analysis 5.3 (1968): 506–517. 
 McLachlan, Robert I., and G. Reinout W. Quispel. Splitting methods. Acta Numerica 11 (2002): 341–434. 
 LeVeque, Randall J., Finite volume methods for hyperbolic problems. Vol. 31. Cambridge University Press, 2002. (pbk )

Numerical differential equations